The Pioneer CLD-1010 is a LaserDisc player introduced by Pioneer Electronics in 1987 as the last of their top-spec players not to be part of their "Elite" lineup.

History 
The player was introduced in 1987 to take over the spot previously filled by the LD-S1, Pioneer's most expensive LaserDisc player (however, the later LD-S2 would be the S1's official replacement). The unit's internals were largely carryover parts from the S1, including advanced circuitry to reduce picture noise and the ability to down-convert digital soundtracks to analog for output to analog sound systems and television sets; like the S1, it lacked a dedicated output for digital sound, although one can be added.

In addition to the S1's already advanced-for-the-day electronics, the 1010 featured a new red-diode laser which had a significantly positive impact on playback quality. The red-diode laser has a narrower wavelength than is normal for LD players, allowing it to more accurately track data paths on the disc without causing crosstalk, a side effect of the wide wavelength laser used in most players (see the LaserDisc article for more information). In addition, the red coloring of the laser made it easier for the system to read-over disc surface imperfections like scratches, fingerprints, dust or laser-rot, meaning that even somewhat damaged discs could be read accurately by the system; it is one of only two players manufactured by Pioneer to ever use a red-diode laser, the other being the much newer and more expensive HLD-X9 Muse LD player.

The CLD-1010 was also the first LaserDisc player capable of playing the then-new CD Video format of discs.

Although its high price and the general worldwide disinterest in LaserDisc kept the player from becoming a major success, it is today often lauded by those who continue to enjoy the now defunct LD format. Its advanced noise-reduction circuitry and red-diode laser help provide a very appealing picture, while their very low pricing (usually around $50 USD) make them easily affordable. However, the age of the players means that they are often in need of service or repairs, something that has become difficult both because of the dearth of repair shops capable of working on them and because Pioneer has largely abandoned manufacturing replacement parts for them. Nonetheless, a fully reconditioned player can be had for around $200, a relative bargain considering the prices often commanded by other high quality units.

The S1 was replaced by the LD-S2, one of the first pieces of equipment in the then-new "Elite" lineup.

Upgradeability 
Despite its capabilities, the S1 lacks two features often demanded by LD enthusiasts: a dedicated output for digital audio and an AC-3 output capable of sending out the modulated AC-3/Dolby Digital audio found on most LD releases from the mid and late 1990s. Fortunately, both are fairly easy to add to the player and often technicians that are qualified to recondition the players are also capable of adding the outputs.

Subsequent models 
Later models under the same line include the CLD 2070, 2090, 3090 & 3390. The video of the CLD 2090 was impressive, and rivals the Elite models which were released shortly in the early 90s. Pioneer started the Elite line to separate the mid range players from the higher end players. The CLD 2090 comes with S-video out and optical audio out. In comparison, the video quality even surpasses the late 90s model DVL 909 (LD and DVD player).

References

External links
 A page on the CLD-1010

LaserDisc
CLD-1010